Michael E. Mantha  is a politician in Ontario, Canada. He is a New Democratic member of the Legislative Assembly of Ontario who was first elected in 2011. He represents the riding of Algoma—Manitoulin.

Background
Prior to his election, Mantha was a staffer in the riding office of Carol Hughes, the federal Member of Parliament for Algoma—Manitoulin—Kapuskasing. He lives in Elliot Lake, Ontario with his wife Pauline and their two sons.

Politics
Mantha ran in the 2011 provincial election as the New Democratic candidate in the riding of Algoma—Manitoulin. He defeated Liberal incumbent Mike Brown by 4,188 votes. He was re-elected in the 2014 provincial election defeating Liberal candidate Craig Hughson by 7,668 votes. Mantha was re-elected in the 2022 Ontario general election.

He served the party's critic for a number of portfolios, including Northern Development and Mines, Indigenous Relations and Reconciliation and Northern Development and Tourism.

Mantha has passed several pieces of important legislation, including a motion that was unanimously passed to create a lyme disease strategy in Ontario.

Electoral record

References

External links

Franco-Ontarian people
Living people
Ontario New Democratic Party MPPs
People from Elliot Lake
21st-century Canadian politicians
Year of birth missing (living people)